Droga Kolinska is a food processing company from Slovenia, majority owned by Croatian Atlantic Grupa.

History
Droga Kolinska came into existence with the merger of the companies Droga d.d. from Portorož and Kolinska d.d. from Ljubljana.

In November 2010, Istrabenz sold its majority share in Droga Kolinska to Croatian Atlantic Grupa for a total of 382 million euros (243.11 million euros and debts).

References

1996 establishments in Slovenia
2010 mergers and acquisitions
Food and drink companies of Slovenia